In additive combinatorics, the Plünnecke–Ruzsa inequality is an inequality that bounds the size of various sumsets of a set , given that there is another set  so that  is not much larger than . A slightly weaker version of this inequality was originally proven and published by Helmut Plünnecke (1970).
Imre Ruzsa (1989) later published a simpler proof of the current, more general, version of the inequality.
The inequality forms a crucial step in the proof of Freiman's theorem.

Statement

The following sumset notation is standard in additive combinatorics.
 
 
 

Plünnecke-Ruzsa inequality
The most commonly cited version of the statement of the Plünnecke–Ruzsa inequality is the following.

In this case, the Plünnecke–Ruzsa inequality states that sumsets formed from a set with small doubling constant must also be small.

Plünnecke's inequality
The version of this inequality that was originally proven by Plünnecke (1970) is slightly weaker.

Proof

Ruzsa triangle inequality
 

The Ruzsa triangle inequality is an important tool which is used to generalize Plünnecke's inequality to the Plünnecke–Ruzsa inequality. Its statement is:

Proof of Plünnecke-Ruzsa inequality

The following simple proof of the Plünnecke–Ruzsa inequality is due to Petridis (2014).

Lemma: Let  and  be finite subsets of an abelian group .

Finally, let . The definition of  implies that . Thus, by the definition of these sets, 

Hence, considering the sizes of the sets, 

To bound the right side of this inequality, let . Thus, by definition, so .

Again by definition, so . Hence, 

Putting the above two inequalities together gives 

This completes the proof of the lemma.

It is first necessary to show that 

This can be proved by induction. Thus, the definition of  implies that .

This completes the induction. Finally, the Ruzsa triangle inequality gives 

Because , it must be the case that . Therefore, 

This completes the proof of the Plünnecke–Ruzsa inequality.

Plünnecke graphs

Both Plünnecke's proof of Plünnecke's inequality and Ruzsa's original proof of the Plünnecke–Ruzsa inequality use the method of Plünnecke graphs. Plünnecke graphs are a way to capture the additive structure of the sets  in a graph theoretic manner

To define a Plünnecke graph we first define commutative graphs and layered graphs:

Definition.

 is called commutative if it is semicommutative and the graph formed by reversing all its edges is also semicommutative.

Definition.

Definition.  A Plünnecke graph is a layered graph which is commutative.

The canonical example of a Plünnecke graph is the following, which shows how the structure of the sets  form a Plünnecke graph.

Example. Let  be subsets of an abelian group. Create the edge  (where  and ) whenever there exists  such that .
Then  is a Plünnecke graph. Thus,  is semicommutative.

In particular, in the aforementioned example,  is just .

Formally, 

Plünnecke's theorem is the following statement about Plünnecke graphs.

The proof of Plünnecke's theorem involves a technique known as the "tensor product trick", in addition to an application of Menger's theorem.

The Plünnecke–Ruzsa inequality is a fairly direct consequence of Plünnecke's theorem and the Ruzsa triangle inequality. Then, by Ruzsa's triangle inequality (on ), 

thus proving the Plünnecke–Ruzsa inequality.

See also
 Additive combinatorics
 Freiman's theorem
 Ruzsa triangle inequality

References

Additive combinatorics